Canning Vale is a southern suburb of Perth,  from the central business district. Its local government areas are the City of Canning (west of Nicholson Road) and the City of Gosnells (east of Nicholson Road).

History
It was locally known as North Jandakot until 1925.

Until the late 1970s, Canning Vale was a farming area consisting of mostly market gardens and dairy farms due to its swampy terrain with an unusually high abundance of permanent fresh water. Most of the area which is now residential was zoned rural under the Metropolitan Region Scheme until 1994.

Developers of residential areas have incorporated numerous landscaped lakes into their developments, which serve an important function in draining this swampy area.

Planning for the area incorporated future railway stations at Nicholson and Ranford roads, called Nicholson Road and Ranford Road respectively. These stations

Geography
Canning Vale is bounded by Warton Road to the southeast, Garden Street and Nicholson Road to the northeast, Roe Highway to the north and northwest, and Clifton and Acourt roads to the southwest.

The suburb is split into three distinct regions. North of the rail line near Roe Highway is an industrial area that has a number of major warehousing operations including Market City, a wholesale fresh produce market. Also in the area are many distribution facilities such as the IGA distribution centre. Canning Vale's industrial precinct houses major warehouse production sites such as Swan Brewery (which has been closed and redeveloped) and ACI Packaging, as well as manufacturing plants for the commercial building and mining maintenance industry, such as Complete Field Maintenance and BGC. South of the line is residential with shopping areas. The western edge of the suburb, contained within a nature reserve, is the Hakea Prison complex.

The industrial area is within the boundary of the City of Canning as well as a portion of the residential estates (including Ranford, Livingston and Waratah). The remainder of the residential area and the prison complex are within the boundaries of the City of Gosnells.

Demographics

At the 2001 Australian census, Canning Vale had a mostly lower-middle income population of 12,849 people living in 4,115 dwellings, all but 205 of which were separate houses. The population is very diverse, with 14% of East or South-East Asian descent, and sizeable Indian and Italian minorities.

At the 2006 census, Canning Vale had a population of 23,289, which was predominantly Catholic (24.9%), married (62.8%), and with a median household income of $1,591 per week. Canning Vale has 6,331 families of which 62.8% were couples.

At the 2011 census, the suburb had a population of 30,666, still maintaining its ethnic and religious diversity; 15% of the suburb was of either Chinese or Indian ancestry, and Buddhism and Islam were the third and fourth most practised beliefs in the suburb (after Catholicism, no religion and Anglicanism).

At the 2016 census, the suburb's population was 33,059, with people of either Chinese or Indian ancestry making up 22.4%% of the total.

Facilities
Canning Vale contains five retail precincts, four within the residential areas. A large industrial area is located in the north-west.

Community facilities include five primary schools (Canning Vale opened in 1994, Ranford1999, Campbell2002, Excelsior2005, Caladenia2007, and the private school St Emilie's Catholic), the high school Canning Vale College, and numerous churches, a Sikh temple, a Hindu temple, a community centre and one golf course (Gosnells Golf Club).

Canning Vale has a junior football club, going under the name of Canning Vale Cougars Junior Football Club. No AFL players have come from the Canning Vale Cougars, but a few WAFL players have come from Canning Vale. The club celebrated their 10th anniversary in 2006. Canning Vale also has a cricket team which is run by the South East Metro Junior Cricket Council and goes by the name of Canning Vale Junior/Senior Cricket Club.

The Canning Vale Senior Football Club (established 2011) has participated in the WA Amateur Football League ever since its formation. It has won the 2011, 2012, and 2013 premierships. Their home matches are played at Clifton Park.

Canning Vale also has a cheerleading club called Extreme Cheer Allstars, which has classes from 2 to 18+ for boys and girls. This club is located just off Nicholson Road in the heart of Canning Vale.

The main shopping centre, Livingston Marketplace, is situated at the corner of Ranford Road and Nicholson Road. A second shopping centre, The Vale, is located on the corner of Warton Road and Amherst Road, along Canning Vale's eastern boundary.

The section of Canning Vale to the north of the Nicholson and Warton Road intersection contains Hakea Prison, Melaleuca Remand and Reintegration Facility, and Banksia Hill Juvenile Detention Centre.

Transport
Canning Vale's northern boundary is the Roe Highway, which connects with the Kwinana Freeway (west) and Albany Highway (east) and provides access to Perth Airport, while Nicholson Road heads north towards Cannington, Western Australia and Westfield Carousel, and Ranford Road goes to Armadale (southeast) and Fremantle over Kwinana Freeway via South Street (northwest).

Canning Vale is served by a range of buses linking the area to the Perth central business district, Murdoch University and to Cannington. Many bus services connect with Transperth trains at Murdoch, Maddington or Thornlie stations. A train station is also being built.

Politics
Canning Vale is a classic mortgage belt suburb which leans towards the Labor Party in federal and state elections.

References

External links